Sandi Valentinčič  (born 25 August 1967) is a former Slovenian football midfielder.

Club career
Valentinčič played for Olimpija in the Yugoslav Second League and VfB Oldenburg in the German 2. Bundesliga.

International career
Valentinčič made six appearances for the senior Slovenia national football team between 1995 and 1997.

References

External links
 
 PrvaLiga profile 

1967 births
Living people
Yugoslav footballers
Slovenian footballers
Association football midfielders
Slovenia international footballers
NK Olimpija Ljubljana (1945–2005) players
ND Gorica players
VfB Oldenburg players
NK Primorje players
Maccabi Jaffa F.C. players
NK Korotan Prevalje players
FC Rot-Weiß Erfurt players
NK Ivančna Gorica players
Slovenian expatriate footballers
Expatriate footballers in Germany
Expatriate footballers in Israel
Slovenian expatriate sportspeople in Germany
Slovenian expatriate sportspeople in Israel
Yugoslav Second League players
Slovenian PrvaLiga players
2. Bundesliga players
Liga Leumit players
Slovenian football managers